1-[4-(Trifluoromethyl)phenyl]piperazine  is a serotonergic releasing agent. It is rarely encountered as a designer drug but is much less common than the “normal” isomer meta-TFMPP.

See also
 Substituted piperazine

References

Phenylpiperazines
Serotonin receptor agonists
Serotonin releasing agents
Trifluoromethyl compounds